Divina Frau-Meigs (born 9 June 1959) is a Moroccan-born sociologist of media and professor at the Sorbonne Nouvelle University Paris III (Paris III) in France where her areas of research include, cultural diversity, dynamic identities, human/children's rights, internet governance, media education, media matrices, media in English-speaking countries, and risky content. Her research has also included media content and risk behaviors, the reception and use of Information and communications technology, and American studies. She is the chair of "Savoir-devenir in sustainable digital development" for UNESCO and coordinator of "TRANSLIT" for the Agence nationale de la recherche.

Early life and education
Divina Frau-Meigs was born in Casablanca, Morocco, on 9 June 1959, to Spanish parents.

She graduated from the École normale supérieure de lettres et sciences humaines (English, 1980) and received her master's degree from Stanford University (Education and Communication, 1984). She then taught English at Sorbonne Paris North University (1985-1988), before returning to the U.S. to obtain a second master's degree from the Annenberg School for Communication at the University of Pennsylvania (Communication, 1991). In the 1980s, Frau-Meigs was a recipient of a Fulbright (1983-84), Ministry of Higher Education (1984-85), and "Lavoisier" (1988-189) scholarships.

A comparative analysis of the contents of television programs in nine countries of the world and the role of the USA in the production of these contents).

Career and research
In 1993, Frau-Meigs was elected Associate Professor at Paris III. In 1999, she obtained her habilitation to direct research at the Paris III with a dissertation entitled,  (From television to screen subcultures: representation in all its states, in the United States). In 1999, she was promoted to professor at the University of Orléans, before returning to Paris III in 2004. In 2006, she held the information-communication chair at the Autonomous University of Barcelona, giving a doctoral course on cultural diversity in globalization. 

Frau-Meigs is a specialist in media, content, and risky behaviors (violence, pornography, information, media panics) as well as in questions of reception and use of information and communication technologies (acculturation, education, regulation). She directs a research center, the "Center for Research on the English-Speaking World" (CREW, ÉA 4399) in Paris III. She also directs a professional master's degree entitled "Computer Applications: Management, Studies, Multimedia, eLearning" (AIGÉME) at the same university, with a double specialization: "Distance Learning Engineering" and "Media Literacy Engineering" (face-to-face and distance learning courses). 

The author of more than 300 articles and approximately 30 books, Frau-Meigs has published on issues of cultural diversity and acculturation, as well as on e-learning, digital identity, and internet governance. She has served as vice-president for international relations of the French Society for Information and Communication Sciences (1993-96) and vice-president of the International Association for Information and Communication Studies and Research (IAMCR) (2002-08). In 2000, she was a founding member of the European Consortium for Communications Research (ECCR). Frau-Meigs is a member of the Scientific Council of the Inter-Associative Collective "Enfance-Médias" (CIEM) (2003-). She sits on the board of the European Communication Research and Education Association (ECREA) (2008-).

Awards and honours
 2006, E-Toile d'Or Civil Society Award, AUTRANS 2006, Grenoble
 2016, Global Media and Information Literacy (MIL) Award

Selected works 
 Écrans de la violence, Economica, 1997 (with Sophie Jehel) 
Médias et technologies : l’exemple des États-Unis, Ellipses, collection "Universités : anglais", 2001  
 Médiamorphoses américaines, Economica, 2001 (with Francis Bordat and John Dean)  
 Dossier de l’audiovisuel, number 108 "Les programmes jeunesse : réenchanter la télévision", March-April 2003 (director) 
 Jeunes, médias, violences, Economica, 2003 (public version of the report of the Interassociative Collective "Childhood and Media" - CIEM, Environnement médiatique : que transmettons-nous à nos enfants) (with Sophie Jehel) 
 Qui a détourné le 11 septembre ? Journalisme, information et démocratie aux États-Unis, Ina-de Boeck, collection "Médias recherches", 2006  
 Kit pour l’éducation aux médias à l’usage des enseignants, des parents et des professionnels, Unesco, 2007 (pdf) (director) 
 Mapping Media Education Policies in the World: Visions, Programmes and Challenges, Unesco, Alliance des civilisations, 2009 (pdf) (with Jordi Torrent)
 Médias et cognition sociale : dépasser les paniques médiatiques, Érès, 2010 
 Media Matters in the cultural contradictions of the information society. Towards a human rights-based governance, Presses du Conseil de l’Europe, 2010
 Penser la société de l'écran : dispositifs et usages, Presses Sorbonne nouvelle, collection "Les fondamentaux de la Sorbonne nouvelle", 2011  
 Socialisation des jeunes et éducation aux médias : du bon usage des contenus et comportements à risque, Érès, collection "Éducation et société", 2011  
 Faut-il avoir peur des fake news ?, Documentation française, 2019

References

External links
 Personal website

1959 births
Living people
People from Casablanca
Moroccan academics
Information and communications technology
École Normale Supérieure alumni
Stanford University alumni
Annenberg School for Communication at the University of Pennsylvania alumni